The fanged water snake (Ptychophis flavovirgatus) is a genus of snake in the family Colubridae.

It is endemic to Brazil.

References 

Colubrids
Reptiles described in 1915
Snakes of South America
Reptiles of Brazil